Baschenis was an Italian family of artists, mainly painters.

Lanfranco dynasty 
 Antonio Baschenis (1450/1490)
 Angelo Baschenis (1450/1490)
 Giovanni Baschenis (1471/1503)
 Battista Baschenis (1471/1503)

Cristoforo dynasty 

 Cristoforo I Baschenis (doc. 1465/1475)
 Dionisio Baschenis (doc. 1493)
 Simone I Baschenis (doc. 1488/1503)
 Cristoforo II Baschenis (doc. 1472/1520)
 Simone II Baschenis (1495 ca. /1555)
 Filippo Baschenis (doc. 1537/ 1596)
 Cristoforo Baschenis il Vecchio  (1520 ca/1613 ca.)
 Cristoforo Baschenis il Giovane (1560 ca./1626 ca.)
 Pietro Baschenis (1590 ca./1630)
 Evaristo Baschenis (1617 - 1677)
 Bartolomeo Baschenis

Others 
Marcello Baschenis (1829–1888), Italian painter

External links
Dynasty of Baschenis

Italian families
Painters from Bergamo